The Children's Cancer and Leukaemia Group is an organization focused on childhood cancer. The organization was formed on 1 August 2006, as a result of the merger of the United Kingdom Children's Cancer Study Group (UKCCSG) and the UK Childhood Leukaemia Working Party (UK CLWP).

Activities 
The United Kingdom Children's Cancer Study Group(UKCCSG) was found in 1977 by paediatric oncologists and soon after, the UK Childhood Leukaemia Working Party was formed. The Children's Cancer and Leukemia Group(CCLG) had expanded to over 600 members, with a network of 21 Paediatric Oncology Centres throughout the United Kingdom and Ireland alongside over 70 corresponding members worldwide. The multidisciplinary membership of the Group includes clinicians, pathologists, epidemiologists, basic scientists and representatives of other disciplines. CCLG aims to advance childhood cancer studies, facilitate collaborative research and clinical trials and also improve standards of care for adolescents with cancer.

The main area of activity is the coordination of clinical trials. The Group targets a broad range of studies relating to childhood cancer. Trials are virtually ran internationally and colleague-collaboration in Europe. Members of the Group led roles in several major clinical trials, alongside fostering and expanding international collaboration.

In the 1980s, only 20% of children with cancer survived. In society today, about 75% of children with cancer are cured. Investigations regarding the latest advanced treatments, long-term effects of diseases, psycho-social impacts on survivors, their quality of life post-treatment and patients undergoing treatment are on the rise. Malignant tumors with poor prognosis remain a challenge for research.

CCLG is also part of coordinating the national tumour bank designed to support and facilitate biological studies which aims to have an in-depth understanding of the disease and to improve future treatment options. Childhood cancer is relatively rare with about 1,700 new cases per year. Through the extensive network of 21 treatment centres, it is possible for children with cancer to be treated in specialist centres.

Contact is a national magazine that was launched in 1998 for families of children with childhood cancer. It contains information that aims to reduce the sense of isolation felt by patients and their families. Ranges of booklets were shortly introduced and publications accessible via www.childcancer.org.uk.

The Group has no permanent funding source and collects funds through short-term grants and grant awarding bodies. CCLG is also a registered charity with funds used for support research in specific tumour-types. Activities of the CCLG are coordinated through the Data Centre that is part of the University of Leicester and are managed by the Executive Director.

See also 
 Cancer in the United Kingdom

References

External links
 CCLG website

Cancer organisations based in the United Kingdom
Pediatric organizations
Organizations established in 2006